Henrik [Heinrich] Franz Alexander Baron von Eggers (4 December 1844 – 1903), was a Danish professional soldier and botanist.

Life
After studies at the gymnasium in Odense he entered the Danish army as subaltern in 1864 and fought in the Danish-German war.

At the end of 1864 he joined the Imperial Mexican Volunteer Corps  and fell into captivity of the Mexican Republicans at the end of the month-long siege of Oaxaca. He was freed in 1867, rejoined the Danish army as lieutenant and had himself posted in the Danish Antilles, where he served until his retirement, as captain, in 1885. In 1873 he married Mathilde Camilla Stakemann.

His retirement from the army marked the beginning of his career as botanist. He studied and published the flora of St. Croix, St. John, St. Thomas, Water Island and Vieques. He made numerous trips and collected extensively on virtually all the islands of the Greater and Lesser Antilles: Dominica in 1880, Puerto Rico in 1881 and 1883, Tortola, St. Kitts, the Dominican Republic and Turks in 1887, Haiti, Jamaica and the Bahamas in 1888–89 and Tobago, Trinidad, Grenada, St. Vincent and Barbados in 1889–90. He moved to Ecuador in 1891 where he stayed until 1897 making numerous collections. He had a hacienda at El Recreo, in the vicinity of San Vicente in Manabí province.

The plant genus Eggersia was named for him by Joseph Dalton Hooker. The species Eggersia buxifolia (Hook.f.) is synonymous with Neea buxifolia (Hook.f.) Heimerl.

Species named for Eggers
Strumigenys eggersi – Eggers' dacetine ant
 Agave eggersiana – St. Croix century plant
 Erythrina eggersii

Notes 
 Baron is a title, not a first or middle name.

References 
Urban, Ignaz. Notae biographicae, Symb. Antill. 3:40,1900.
Short biography at MOBOT
Extensive biography at Dansk biografisk Lexikon, 4:438, 1887–1905
Species named for Eggers at IPNI

Bibliography 
Publications by Baron Eggers on WorldCat

External links 
The Flora of St. Croix and the Virgin Islands by Eggers at the Biodiversity Heritage Library

1844 births
1903 deaths
19th-century Danish botanists
Botanists active in South America
Botanists active in the Caribbean
Danish expatriates in Mexico